YITP can stand for: 

Yukawa Institute for Theoretical Physics
C. N. Yang Institute for Theoretical Physics